Floridobia is a genus of very small freshwater snails that have an operculum, aquatic gastropod molluscs or micromolluscs in the family Hydrobiidae, the mud snails.

Species
Species within the genus Floridobia include:

Floridobia alexander
Floridobia floridana
Floridobia fraterna
Floridobia helicogyra (Thompson, 1968), Crystal siltsnail
Floridobia mica (Thompson, 1968), Ichetucknee siltsnail
Floridobia monroensis(Dall, 1885), Enterprise siltsnail
Floridobia parva Thompson, 1968, Pygmy siltsnail
Floridobia peracuta
Floridobia petrifons
Floridobia ponderosa (Thompson, 1968), Ponderous siltsnail
Floridobia porteri
Floridobia vanhyningi (Vanatta, 1934), Seminole siltsnail
Floridobia wekiwae (Thompson, 1968), Wekiwa siltsnail
Floridobia winkleyi

References

Further reading 
 

 
Hydrobiidae